State Route 739 (SR 739) is a  long north–south state highway in the central portion of the U.S. state of Ohio. The northern terminus of SR 739 is near downtown Marion, where it meets SR 4 and SR 423.

Route description
SR 739 starts near the Honda Marysville Auto Plant, then passes through the western and northern portions of Union County, including the communities of Raymond, York Center, Byhalia, Arbela, West Jackson, and Essex.  It continues through Green Camp and into Marion in the southwestern part of Marion County.  No part of this state route is included within National Highway System (NHS), a network of highways deemed to be most important for the economy, mobility and defense of the nation.

History
SR 739 made its debut in 1937.  Since its inception, it has utilized the same routing through portions of Union and Marion Counties.

Major intersections

References

External links

739
Transportation in Union County, Ohio
Transportation in Marion County, Ohio